The Fonte River Dam is a historic dam on the Fonte River on the island of Guam. It is located in the upper third of the river's main valley, which is located between Nimitz Hill Annex and Agana Heights, and lies below and west of the Libugon scenic overlook on Nimitz Hill. The dam, built in 1910, was part of the first organized effort by the United States Navy to provide a reliable water supply to the island's major settlement, Hagåtña (formerly Agana). It is almost complete obscured by jungle overgrowth.

The dam was listed on the National Register of Historic Places in 2014.

See also
National Register of Historic Places in Guam

References

Buildings and structures on the National Register of Historic Places in Guam
Buildings and structures completed in 1910
Dams on the National Register of Historic Places
Dams in Guam
Dams completed in 1910
1910 establishments in Guam
Asan-Maina, Guam